Micro-80 Pinball Machine is a 1980 video game published by Micro-80 Inc. for the TRS-80 16K. It was also published as a type-in BASIC listing in the July 1980 issue of SoftSide.

Contents
Micro-80 Pinball Machine is a pinball game with multiple scenarios.

Reception
Jon Mishcon reviewed Micro-80 Pinball Machine in The Space Gamer No. 40. Mishcon commented that "Overall, I'd say this is a good buy for kids. For the serious video/pinball fan forget it."

References

1980 video games
TRS-80 games
TRS-80-only games
Video games developed in the United States